C. I. Paul (1944 – 14 December 2005) was a Malayalam film and television actor.

He was a member of the working party led by Fr. Vadakkan and came to acting through the famous dramas by V. L. Jose. He was well appreciated for his performance in Kalanilayam dramas.

His silver screen break came with Madatharuvi, in which he played the role of Fr Benedict. He acted in around 300 films and several TV serials since then. Paul, who started out as a character actor proved that he could handle comedy and villain roles with equal panache.

C. I. Paul died on 14 December 2005 at Thrissur due to heart failure. He was survived by his mother, who died a few years later. His wife had predeceased him and he did not have children.

Filmography

1960s

1970s

1980s

1990s

2000s

2010s

References

External links
 CI Paul at MSI
 

1944 births
2005 deaths
Male actors in Malayalam cinema
Indian male film actors
Male actors from Thrissur
20th-century Indian male actors
21st-century Indian male actors